Epimolis conifera is a moth of the family Erebidae. It was described by Paul Dognin in 1912. It is found in Colombia.

References

Phaegopterina
Moths described in 1912